The Projecta was an English automobile manufactured only in 1914 at the Percival White Engineering Works, Highbury, London.  A monocoque-bodied two seat cyclecar, it was powered by a vee-twin JAP engine with two speed gearbox and belt drive to the rear wheels.

Other uses
Projecta is also a Dutch manufacturer of projection screens.

See also
 List of car manufacturers of the United Kingdom

References
David Burgess Wise, The New Illustrated Encyclopedia of Automobiles.

Cyclecars
Defunct motor vehicle manufacturers of England
Motor vehicle manufacturers based in London